Newton's series may refer to:
 The Newton series for finite differences, used in interpolation theory.
 The binomial series, first proved by Isaac Newton.